Njaba River (also Njaba), in the Niger Delta Basin is a major tributary of Oguta Lake in Nigeria's South East Imo State. With 4.5m mean depth, the river has a total stream length of 78.2 km, basin area of 145.63 square kilometers and an average specific discharge of about 1700 m3/hour.

Flow

Njaba flows in an almost east-western direction, taking off from Amucha and Ekwe passing through several towns including Okwudor, Awo-Omamma and Mgbidi before emptying into Oguta Lake.

Oil and Gas
Some of the oil fields in the river basin include Ossu, Izombe and Njaba operated under ChevronTexaco’s OML 53 and Addax Petroleum's OML 124 both in Izombe. OML 124 contains another undeveloped Njaba 2 well onshore Nigeria discovered December 2008 in the town of Awo-Omamma. According to Addax Petroleum, there are also several identified exploration prospects yet to be drilled and tested around Njaba. Jean Claude Gandur, president and chief executive officer of Addax Petroleum, was extremely proud to report the leading Njaba oil discovery. The field has potentials of being one of the company's largest fields in Nigeria as well as capable of developing the economy of Njaba river basin, Imo State and Nigeria when developed. In line with directive of the Federal Government of Nigeria to stop gas flaring by year 2008, a plan has been underway to develop a gas processing plant in the river basin under Izombe Integrated Gas Processing Project.

Oil Palm Trade
Njaba River route made its towns such as Oguta, Mgbidi, Osemotor and Awo-Omamma important commercial centres of trade in the past. Like many other areas of the Eastern Region, upon abolishment of slave trade in 1830, Oil Palm business traded in the River basin as a source of cash. Oil mill factories were established in many communities of the river basin including the then famous Umuezukwe Oil mill located near the waterfront in Awo-omamma. By 1903, exports in the oil trade increased due to new waterways developed to move the products to the coast.

Economy, Environment, and Infrastructure
Fishermen, Fish Landing sites and Fisheries Cooperative Societies exist in many Imo State communities; some are found in villages of Awo-Omamma, Oguta, Abiaziem, Nnebukwu, Nkwesi et al. in Njaba River Basin. Among them are Udoka Fish Farmers Group, Umuezukwe, Awo-omamma and Kalabari Beach Fishermen Coop. Society, Oguta.  And their respective landing sites include Umuezukwe (Ughamiri), Umudei, K-beach, Osse Abiaziem and Osemotor located in Awo-Omamma and Oguta villages. These farmers experience economic constraints that militate against efficient operation of their fish and crop farming activities.

Intervention is needed to solve many of these infrastructure and environmental issues in the villages of Awo-Omamma, Izombe, Oguta, the greater oil-rich river basin and many other farming communities in Imo State. Assistance is needed in development of motorable access roads to these fishing villages and ports such as Umuezukwe, Ubahaeze, Abiaziem, Izombe et al. as well as in support of modern fish and crop processing activities through electricity generation and agricultural subsidies On Monday, January 28, 2013, angry youths protested the State Government’s insensitivity to plight of their people whose roads linking Awo-omamma to Okwudor and other neighbouring communities, they alleged had been abandoned for years by successive administrations in the state.

According to Morgan Orioha "the mitigation of potential, and/or, arrest of real, environmental hazards and changes go beyond advocacy to implementation of ideas, policies and established Sustainable Development Goals(UN SDGs)". Therefore, "environmental laws should be developed (where none exists) and implemented, to educate and enforce sustainability across communities and businesses operating in the Oil producing States and, in fact, across Nigeria’s 36 States". In managing climate reality, Morgan K. Orioha thinks that "sustainability strategy should focus on discouraging inefficient and unsustainable practices through development and implementation of sustainable development policies, regulations, and attraction of sustainable investments and projects where applicable". Like many other areas of the Niger Delta, the continuous flaring of gases at flow stations constitutes a threat to ambient air in the area. 

It is projected that upon completion, Izombe Gas Processing Plant would be a major inland gas processing hub for most stranded gas within Njaba River axis. It would contribute to meeting not only the energy demand of Imo State and Nigeria, but it would create much needed jobs to support the river basin's economy.

References

Oil fields of Nigeria
Rivers of Nigeria
Inner Niger Delta
Geography of Nigeria
Imo State